Jason David Ian Puncheon (born 18 June 1986) is an English professional footballer who plays as a midfielder for Cypriot First Division club Anorthosis Famagusta .

Following his goal against Everton on his Blackpool debut, he has scored in all of the top four divisions of English league football, scoring for Barnet in League Two, Milton Keynes Dons and Southampton in League One, Millwall in the Championship and Blackpool, Southampton and Crystal Palace in the Premier League.

Club career

Early career
Born in Croydon, Greater London, Puncheon began his career with Wimbledon, and moved with the team to Milton Keynes, where the club became Milton Keynes Dons in 2004. He was released in January 2006. He moved to Barnet in June of the same year, after brief spells with Fisher Athletic and Lewes. He was named FA Cup Player of the Third Round in 2007 and the following season after scoring a succession of brilliant goals (including a last minute 35-yard free kick versus Bradford) was named in the PFA Team of the Season.

Plymouth Argyle
Plymouth Argyle signed Puncheon from Barnet for £250,000 in 2008. He endured an unsuccessful 18-month spell at the club, making six league appearances. He was loaned to former club MK Dons three times in two years, where he scored 12 goals in 61 appearances.

Southampton
On 30 January 2010, Puncheon joined Southampton which then led to his loan deal at MK Dons to be cut short. He scored his first goal in a 5–1 victory over Walsall, and scored again a few days later, in a 5–0 victory over Huddersfield.

At the start of the 2010–11 season, he was a regular in the first team. However, when Alan Pardew lost his job just days after a 4–0 win away to Bristol Rovers, Southampton hired Nigel Adkins as manager. Under Adkins, he stayed in the first team, but found himself under increasing pressure from Alex Oxlade-Chamberlain for his place. Eventually Adkins lost patience with Puncheon's erratic performances, and dropped him to the bench in favour of 17-year-old Chamberlain, who was later sold to Arsenal for a reported £15m. On 16 November 2010, Puncheon moved on an emergency loan deal to Millwall. He scored his first goal on his first game for Millwall in their 1–0 victory over Middlesbrough. On 1 January 2011, Puncheon scored a hat-trick in the 3–0 victory over Crystal Palace.

On 31 January 2011, Puncheon joined Blackpool on loan until the end of the season. He made his debut, scoring a goal, at Everton on 5 February. He scored his second goal against Chelsea on 7 March at Bloomfield Road. Puncheon re-joined the Saints after Blackpool's failed attempt to fight off relegation. On 31 August 2011, Puncheon joined Queens Park Rangers on loan until 2 January 2012.

He returned to the Saints after his unsuccessful loan spell at QPR, but on 21 January 2012, he publicly criticised Executive chairman Nicola Cortese. However just days later, it was revealed that Puncheon had apologised to Cortese and would be available for selection in the first team. He then started the next two matches: a 1–1 draw in the FA Cup at Millwall and a 1–1 draw in the Championship against Cardiff City.

He scored his first goal of the 2012–13 season with a 30-yard volley in a league cup win at Stevenage. He scored his first Premier League goal for Southampton in a 4–1 home victory against Aston Villa. His second came when Southampton won 3–1 away to Queens Park Rangers. He scored his third Premier League goal in the 61st minute against Reading to secure Southampton a vital 1–0 victory and move them out of the relegation zone. His fourth was scored to give Southampton a 2–2 draw away to the Champions of Europe Chelsea. On 9 February 2013, he scored his fifth in Southampton's 3–1 home win against 2011–12 champions Manchester City.

On 1 March 2013, Puncheon signed a new contract with Southampton, expiring in 2016.

Crystal Palace
On 21 August 2013, Puncheon signed a one-year loan with Crystal Palace. He missed a penalty as Palace lost 2–0 away to Tottenham Hotspur on 11 January 2014, but made up for his miss by scoring the only goal of their 1–0 win against Stoke City the following weekend. On 31 January 2014, Puncheon made his loan spell into a permanent move, for a fee of around £1.75m. Puncheon's three goals in January and a further three in back-to-back wins in April that lifted Palace away from the relegation zone, led boss Tony Pulis to issue a 'hands off' warning to other clubs interesting in signing Puncheon.

On 16 August 2014, in Palace's first match of the new season away to Arsenal, Puncheon took a corner which was headed in by Brede Hangeland for the first goal of the game. He was sent off for his second booking in the 89th minute, after which Arsenal scored their winning goal. On 17 January 2015, Puncheon scored his third goal of the season and second in as many games against Burnley in a 3–2 away win. Crystal Palace had come from 2 goals down to claim victory to boost their survival hopes. Palace manager Alan Pardew praised Puncheon's performance, describing him as "the best player on the pitch by a country mile".

On 6 April 2015, Puncheon scored the winning goal for Crystal Palace against Manchester City. Puncheon's goal came from a freekick which went past Manchester City's goalkeeper Joe Hart. He opened the scoring in the 2016 FA Cup Final against Manchester United with a goal in the 78th minute, but Palace went on to lose the match 2–1 after extra time.

On 18 July 2017, Puncheon replaced Scott Dann as captain. In January 2018, manager Roy Hodgson announced that Puncheon would play no further part in the 2017–18 season following a cruciate ligament injury sustained while playing against Manchester City.

In May 2019, Crystal Palace issued a statement that Puncheon would leave the club at the end of the 2018–19 season after having made 169 appearances and scored 16 goals.

Loan to Huddersfield Town
On 4 January 2019, Puncheon signed for Premier League club Huddersfield Town on loan until the end of the season.

Pafos
In August 2019, Puncheon completed a move to Cypriot football with First Division side Pafos.

Personal life
Puncheon is of Jamaican descent and is eligible for the Jamaica national football team.

In December 2017, Puncheon was arrested and charged with possession of an offensive weapon, common assault, and a public order offence of "causing fear or provocation of violence" after a fight outside a nightclub in Reigate. On 5 January 2018, Puncheon appeared in court where he denied the charge of assault. The charge of possessing an offensive weapon was withdrawn and he was bailed to appear again in court on 4 June. He later changed his plea to guilty and was given a community order requiring him to carry out 210 hours of unpaid work, and pay the doorman involved £250 compensation.

Career statistics

Honours
Southampton
Football League One runner-up: 2010–11

Crystal Palace
FA Cup runner-up: 2015–16

Individual
PFA Team of the Year: 2007–08 League Two, 2009–10 League One

References

External links

1986 births
Living people
Footballers from Croydon
English footballers
Association football wingers
English expatriate footballers
Expatriate footballers in Cyprus
English expatriate sportspeople in Cyprus
Wimbledon F.C. players
Milton Keynes Dons F.C. players
Fisher Athletic F.C. players
Lewes F.C. players
Barnet F.C. players
Plymouth Argyle F.C. players
Southampton F.C. players
Millwall F.C. players
Blackpool F.C. players
Queens Park Rangers F.C. players
Crystal Palace F.C. players
Huddersfield Town A.F.C. players
Pafos FC players
English Football League players
Isthmian League players
National League (English football) players
Premier League players
Black British sportsmen
English people of Jamaican descent
English people convicted of assault
FA Cup Final players